The Botswana records in swimming are the fastest ever performances of swimmers from Botswana, which are recognised and ratified by the Botswana Swimming Sport Association.

All records were set in finals unless noted otherwise.

Long Course (50 m)

Men

Women

Mixed relay

Short Course (25 m)

Men

Women

References

Botswana
Records
Swimming